John Oster (23 May 1902 – 10 July 1956) was an English professional rugby league footballer who played in the 1920s and 1930s. He played at representative level for Great Britain and England, and at club level for Wigan Highfield/London Highfield/Liverpool Stanley(?)

Playing career

International honours
Jack Oster won a cap for England while at Oldham in the 27-20 victory over Other Nationalities at Headingley Rugby Stadium, Leeds on Wednesday 20 March 1929, and won a cap for Great Britain while at Oldham in the 0-0 draw with Australia in the 1929–30 Kangaroo tour of Great Britain match at Station Road, Swinton on Saturday 4 January 1930.

Challenge Cup Final appearances
Jack Oster played  in Warrington's 17-21 defeat by Huddersfield in the 1933 Challenge Cup Final during the 1932–33 season at Wembley Stadium, London on Saturday 6 May 1933, in front of a crowd of 41,784.

Club career
Jack Oster made his début for Warrington on Saturday 27 August 1932, and he played his last match for Warrington on Saturday 9 September 1933.

References

External links
Statistics at orl-heritagetrust.org.uk
Statistics at thisiswarrington.co.uk
Search for "John Oster" at britishnewspaperarchive.co.uk
Search for "Jack Oster" at britishnewspaperarchive.co.uk

1902 births
1956 deaths
England national rugby league team players
English rugby league players
Great Britain national rugby league team players
Lancashire rugby league team players
Liverpool City (rugby league) players
Oldham R.L.F.C. players
Racing Club Albi XIII players
Rugby league five-eighths
Rugby league players from Wigan
Warrington Wolves players